The following is a List of diaspora football teams in Sweden.
The Swedish football league system currently has ten levels, with the first five being governed by the Swedish Football Association. The sixth to tenth levels are controlled by regional associations.
Only three diaspora football clubs have participated in Allsvenskan and Superettan, the highest and second highest football league in Sweden. Assyriska FF participated in Allsvenskan 2005, Syrianska FC in 2011, 2012 and 2013, and Dalkurd FF in 2018. Assyriska FF was the first diaspora football club to reach the second highest division, the highest division and the only one yet to reach a Svenska Cupen final, in 2003.

Notable defunct teams

 SK Hakoah from Malmö existed between 1932–2013 and was the first diaspora football club in Sweden, founded by Jewish immigrants.
 Juventus IF was established by Italians in 1948 and reached as high as the fifth tier. They merged with IFK Stocksund in 2016.
 Topkapi IK existed between 1978 and 2006, established by Turkish immigrants, and reached as high as the third tier.
 Valsta Syrianska IK, from Märsta, Stockholm, was established by Assyrian-Syriacs, existed between 1993–2015 and reached as high as the third tier.
 Växjö United FC, from Växjö, was established by Somalis, existed between 2011–2019 and reached as high as the sixth tier, until they were expelled as a member of the Swedish Football Association, due to financial reasons, false player identities and allegations of match fixing.

References

Assyrian-Syriac